Nigel Lythgoe OBE (born 9 July 1949), also known as Nasty Nigel, is an English television and film director and producer, television dance competition judge, former dancer in the Young Generation and choreographer. He was the producer of the shows Pop Idol and American Idol and is the creator and executive producer of So You Think You Can Dance, on which he served as a permanent judge for the first sixteen seasons. He also created the 2009 competition Superstars of Dance.

Early life 

Born in Wallasey, Cheshire, to dockworker George Percival Lythgoe and Gertrude Emily Lythgoe, he became interested in dance at the age of ten. He began tap dancing, and went on to study at the Hylton-Bromley School of Dance and Drama and the Perry Cowell School of Dance, both in Wallasey, where he studied classical ballet, modern jazz, ballroom, character, classical Greek and National dance from various countries. Lythgoe's first professional job was in the corps de ballet for the English National Ballet tour of The Merry Widow. He trained in London under Joanne Steuer and Molly Molloy. Beginning in 1969, Lythgoe performed with the BBC's  The Young Generation dance troupe. He became their choreographer in 1971 and has since choreographed over 500 television shows.

Career

Early in Lythgoe's career, he learned to use techniques (e.g. multi-cameras) to film choreography well, a skill that would lead to a TV career. During the 1970s and into the 1980s, Lythgoe had the opportunity to perform with dancers from Cyd Charisse to Gene Kelly. He also choreographed for Ben Vereen, Shirley Bassey and (most famously) the Muppets. Lythgoe, in an interview with People said that he was "the only person to dance, choreograph, produce and direct the Royal Variety Performance."

After working his way through the television industry, including at TVS, by 1995, Lythgoe held the post of Head of Entertainment and Comedy at London Weekend Television, where he commissioned and produced shows including Gladiators and Blind Date.

In 2000, he became the tough judge on Popstars and was nicknamed "Nasty Nigel" by the British tabloid press. He was loaned by London Weekend Television to Bob Geldof's television company Planet 24 to executive produce and direct the UK version of Survivor. Lythgoe then joined Simon Fuller's 19 Entertainment group as President of 19 Television. He developed and produced a new show created by Fuller, Pop Idol. This then became a global franchise that includes American Idol.

Lythgoe moved to the U.S. in 2002 to produce American Idol and then became producer/judge and co-creator of So You Think You Can Dance on the FOX television network.

Lythgoe, and his production partner Ken Warwick, who went to school together from age 12, initially agreed to produce the 2007 Emmys, but could not due to scheduling conflicts with SYTYCD.

In 2007, Lythgoe worked with a number of prominent California-based Brits, including then-British Consul-General Bob Peirce, to found BritWeek, an annual program of events held in Los Angeles and Orange County to celebrate the strong business, historical, and entertainment ties between the UK and California.

On 4 August 2008, Lythgoe confirmed that he was leaving American Idol and decided to move on with So You Think You Can Dance.

In 2009, Lythgoe and Fuller formed a company called Big Red 2 Entertainment. Fuller is a fan of Manchester United and Lythgoe of Liverpool. Both teams play in red. Their first venture was Superstars of Dance for NBC.

He is also a judge on So You Think You Can Dance (UK).

On 5 August 2010, American Idol confirmed Lythgoe would be returning as an executive producer to the hit show beginning season 10.

Personal life
Lythgoe married Bonita Shawe in 1974, whom he met while he was choreographer for the BBC's Young Generation dance troupe. Shawe was also an audition judge on the first season of So You Think You Can Dance and was a judge on the Australian version of So You Think You Can Dance for the first three seasons. The couple divorced in 2010 after a protracted separation. They have two sons together, Simon and Kristopher.

He suffered a heart attack in January 2003. He nearly died from a burst appendix in October 2003.

Lythgoe has dated Priscilla Presley and Raquel Welch. He owns Villa San Juliette, a vineyard in Paso Robles, California.

Filmography

Producer (selected credits)
 The Next Great American Band
 So You Think You Can Dance
 All American Girl
 American Juniors
 American Idol
 Pop Idol
 The Brian Conley Show
 Superstars of Dance
 Idol Gives Back
 CMT's Next Superstar

Director
Superstars of Dance (2009)
So You Think You Can Dance (2005)
All American Girl (2003)
American Idol (2002)
Survivor (2001)
Popstars (2000)
Animals Do The Funniest Things (1999)
TV Weekly (1988)
Gladiators (1992)
The Brian Conley Show

Awards and honours
2015 O.B.E - Order of The British Empire by Her Majesty Queen Elizabeth II
2014 Ellis Island International Medal of Honor 
2011 International Emmy: Founders Award - Winner
2008 Emmy: Outstanding Reality/Competition Program - Nominee
2007 The Governors Award - Winner
2007 Emmy: Outstanding Reality/Competition Program - Nominee
2006 Emmy: Outstanding Reality/Competition Program - Nominee
2005 Emmy: Outstanding Reality/Competition Program - Nominee
2004 Emmy: Outstanding Reality/Competition Program - Nominee
2003 Grammy: Album of the Year - Nominee

See also
List of celebrities who own wineries and vineyards

References
Notes

Bibliography
Looseleaf, Victoria (August 2007), "A Man, A Plan, A Wildy Successful TV Show". Dance Magazine. 81 (8):42-46

External links

1949 births
Living people
English choreographers
English male dancers
English television directors
English television producers
International Emmy Founders Award winners
People from Wallasey
Lythgoe family